Darreh Lak may refer to:
 Darreh Lak, Kohgiluyeh and Boyer-Ahmad
 Darreh Lak, West Azerbaijan